Peachtree Street is one of several major streets running through the city of Atlanta.  Beginning at Five Points in downtown Atlanta, it runs North through Midtown; a few blocks after entering into Buckhead, the name changes to Peachtree Road at Deering Road. Much of the city's historic and noteworthy architecture is located along the street, and it is often used for annual parades, (such as the Atlanta St. Patrick's Day Parade and Atlanta Christmas Parade), as well as one-time parades celebrating events such as the 100th anniversary of Coca-Cola in 1986 and the Atlanta Braves' 1995 and 2021 World Series victories.

History

Atlanta grew on a site occupied by the Creek people, which included a major village called Standing Peachtree.  There is some dispute over whether the Creek settlement was called Standing Peachtree or Standing Pitch Tree, corrupted later to peach.  Pine trees, common to the area, were also known as pitch trees due to their sap.

A trail known as the Peachtree Trail stretched from northeast Georgia to Standing Pitch Tree along the Chattahoochee River. The original Peachtree Road began in 1812 at Fort Daniel located at Hog Mountain in present-day Gwinnett County and ran along the course of the trail to the Chattahoochee.  Some portions of the present road trace this route.

After the American Civil War a shantytown named Tight Squeeze developed at Peachtree at what is now 10th Street in Midtown Atlanta. It was infamous for vagrancy, desperation, and robberies of merchants transiting the settlement.

In 1867, the name of Whitehall Street, the original road to White Hall Tavern in today's West End neighborhood, was changed to Peachtree Street from Marietta Street south to the railroad crossing (now "gulch") just north of Alabama Street. Later in the 1980s,<ref>[http://www.atlantatimemachine.com/downtown/whitehall02.htm '"Atlanta Time Machine]</ref> the portion of Whitehall Street from Five Points south to Forsyth Street and Memorial Drive, a major shopping district from the Civil War through mid-20th century, was renamed Peachtree Street SE. 

In 2007, Atlanta mayor Shirley Franklin unveiled a $1 billion, 20-year plan to transform Peachtree Street with streetscape upgrades, public parks, buried utilities, and the addition of a streetcar, based on a sixteen-month study by the Peachtree Corridor Partnership task force.[PAUL DONSKY, MARIA SAPORTA, "A new Peachtree for $1 billion",Atlanta Journal-Constitution, February 14, 2007]

Nomenclature

The Peachtree name is common throughout the Atlanta area. In fact, it is often joked by natives that half of the streets in Atlanta are named Peachtree, and the other half have five names to make up for it.  While “Peachtree” alone almost always refers to this street or its continuations, there are 71 streets in Atlanta with a variant of “Peachtree” in their name. Some include:
 Peachtree Creek Road
 Peachtree Lane
 Peachtree Avenue
 Peachtree Circle
 Peachtree Place
 Peachtree Drive
 Peachtree Plaza
 Peachtree Way
 Peachtree Memorial Drive
 New Peachtree Road
 Peachtree Walk
 Peachtree Park Drive
 Peachtree Parkway
 Peachtree Valley Road
 Peachtree Battle Avenue (commemorating the Battle of Peachtree Creek)
 Peachtree Dunwoody Road (running between Peachtree Street and Dunwoody, Georgia)
 Old Peachtree Road (traces part of the route of the original Peachtree Trail for which the road is named; in Gwinnett County.) 

Peachtree is also seen in place names: 
 Peachtree Center is a major development of skyscrapers and other high-rises in downtown, with Peachtree Center Avenue running a block east of Peachtree Street.
 Peachtree City is a planned-suburb golf community located south of the city, in Fayette County.
 Peachtree Corners is also a planned suburb located north of the city, in Gwinnett County.

West Peachtree Street
West Peachtree Street is not a western branch of Peachtree Street, but a major parallel (and unlike Peachtree, almost perfectly straight) due north–south street running one block west of Peachtree Street through downtown, and mostly two or three blocks west (due to the curves in Peachtree Street) through Midtown.  West Peachtree divides the northeast and northwest quadrants of the city and county for street addressing purposes.

Where the current Peachtree Street turns to Peachtree Road and briefly heads northwest, it actually crosses West Peachtree, leaving it on the "east" side.  It is at this point that the Buford-Spring Connector (Georgia 13) begins, taking the route of old I-85.  The studios of WSB-TV are located on this section of “West” Peachtree Street , which terminates at I-85.  Through this section north of 17th Street in Midtown, and in downtown south of North Avenue to Peachtree Street (and continuing south then southwest on Peachtree to Luckie Street / Auburn Avenue), the MARTA north/northeast line (red and orange/gold trains) runs directly under West Peachtree.  Between the two, it runs no more than a block to the east.

The intersection of the two Peachtree streets in downtown form Hardy Ivy Park, while in midtown, the intersection forms Pershing Point Park.

Route numbers
From the Buford–Spring Connector north to Roswell Road, Peachtree Street and Peachtree Road carry U.S. Route 19 (US 19) and State Route 9 (SR 9). At a five-way intersection with East/West Paces Ferry Road at the center of the original Buckhead Village, US 19 and SR 9 split off onto Roswell Road, while SR 141 begins on Peachtree instead. South of the connector, US 19 and SR 9 continue on two one-way streets: West Peachtree Street northbound and Spring Street southbound.

Peachtree meets Piedmont Road (SR 237) between Buckhead Village and Lenox Square. Besides the southwestern terminus of SR 13 (mentioned above) the only other major intersection in Atlanta is at North Avenue, which carries US 29, US 78, US 278, and SR 8.

There are no direct highway interchanges from Peachtree to the Downtown Connector (I-75/I-85), I-85 itself, or SR 400 freeways, all of which it crosses.

Landmarks

Many of Atlanta's most prominent buildings and landmarks are located along Peachtree Street.  In downtown, 191 Peachtree Tower, Georgia-Pacific Tower, Westin Peachtree Plaza and SunTrust Plaza all line Peachtree.  In Midtown, Bank of America Plaza, Atlanta's tallest building, is a block south of the "Fabulous" Fox Theatre, a grand movie palace completed in 1929.

Author Margaret Mitchell was killed by a speeding car in 1949 while crossing Peachtree Street as a pedestrian at the intersection with 13th Street.  Mitchell wrote her classic Gone With the Wind in the basement apartment of a boarding house at the corner of 10th Street and Peachtree Street.  That house is now a museum and is located across 10th Street from the Federal Reserve Bank of Atlanta which serves the southeastern United States.  The film debuted at the Loew's Grand Theatre, at the corner of Peachtree and Forsyth Street, where the Georgia-Pacific Building now stands.

Office buildings 1100 Peachtree (formerly owned and occupied by BellSouth) and 1180 Peachtree, home to major law firms, are prominent business addresses. The heart of Atlanta's arts scene is found just north on Peachtree where the Woodruff Arts Center, including the High Museum of Art, Atlanta Symphony, Alliance Theatre Company, and the Atlanta campus of the Savannah College of Art & Design are located.

Although most have been demolished, there are still several historic buildings left along Peachtree in Buckhead.  Several of these are stores, in single-story brick buildings constructed well before the annexation of Buckhead in 1952.

Northeast of the city limit, the road goes through Brookhaven and passes Oglethorpe University. Upon entering Chamblee, the road splits into Peachtree Industrial Boulevard and Peachtree Road. Peachtree Road becomes a two-lane road that travels farther east towards Doraville, while Peachtree Industrial Boulevard continues more on a more northerly trajectory (as Georgia 141) towards Dunwoody and Peachtree Corners.

Retail
The Buckhead shopping district features many high-end retailers, concentrated in the Phipps Plaza and Lenox Square malls. Buckhead Atlanta (formerly "Streets of Buckhead") is a mixed-use development that opened in 2014.  The "Midtown Mile" was a concept to make part of Peachtree in Midtown like the Magnificent Mile in Chicago.

Geography

Atlantans are often convinced that the ridge followed by Peachtree Street is part of the Eastern Continental Divide.  While Peachtree Street is atop a ridge, railroad tracks were built on the actual Eastern Continental Divide, which follows DeKalb Avenue from Decatur to Five Points, then turns southwest toward the Atlanta airport, with the northwest side draining into the Chattahoochee or Flint Rivers and therefore into the Gulf of Mexico, and the southeast side eventually into the Atlantic Ocean. In 1959, Whitehall Street SW, which meets Peachtree Street NE at Five Points, was renamed "Peachtree Street SW", and the Eastern Continental Divide follows this street, so a small portion of the story may be technically correct. Atlanta's primary water source is the Chattahoochee and much of the water is pumped over the watershed.  To balance the river flows, treated sewage is pumped back to the Chattahoochee.

In popular culture
In Margaret Mitchell's epic Civil War romance Gone With the Wind, Scarlett O'Hara lives on various points of Peachtree Street along the novel. Coincidentally, it is also where the author herself was struck by a speeding automobile in Midtown, causing her death.
Frank Sinatra co-wrote a song with Jimmy Saunders and Leni Mason called "Peachtree Street" in 1950.  He recorded it as a duet with Rosemary Clooney.
Sir Elton John keeps a home on Peachtree Road in Buckhead, for which his 2004 album Peachtree Road'' was named.
John Mayer references Peachtree Street in his song "Neon."

Gallery

See also
Downtown Atlanta
Midtown Atlanta
Brookwood Hills
Atlanta Streetcar

References

Further reading

External links

Midtown Mile: Atlanta's 14-block urban shopping district on Peachtree Street
Peachtree street: Take Another Look (GPB)
Fort Peachtree replica
Dozens of then/now photographs taken along Peachtree Street can be seen here
Peachtree Corridor Task Force
Peachtree Road historical marker

Roads in Atlanta
U.S. Route 19
Transportation in Fulton County, Georgia
Transportation in DeKalb County, Georgia
Brookhaven, Georgia
Chamblee, Georgia
Doraville, Georgia